The Municipality of Nowra was a municipality of New South Wales that existed from 1871 to 1948.

In 1948, the Municipality of Nowra merged with the Municipalities of Berry, Broughton's Vale, Ulladulla, South Shoalhaven, and the shires of Cambewarra and Clyde to form the Shoalhaven Shire Council.

References 

Nowra